The Nigeria national rugby union team represent Nigeria in men's international rugby union. Nigeria have thus far not qualified for a Rugby World Cup, but have competed in qualifying tournaments.
Nigeria played their first international against Zimbabwe on 1 August 1987, losing by 111-12 in Nairobi. Their greatest success has been in the 2013 Africa Cup, where they beat Mauritius 63-3 in group 1C.

Nigeria tried to qualify for the first time for the 2007 Rugby World Cup, but lost to Senegal (6-48) and Cameroon (8-18), and were eliminated. They also missed the presence at the 2011 Rugby World Cup, after losing to Cameroon (6-26), in the pre-qualifier.

Players

Previous squads 
Nigeria are currently in the Africa Bronze Cup (Division 1C) and will participate in this tournament again in 2017.

Nigeria Squad for the 2012 Africa Cup 
 Michael Adeniya (Westcombe Park, England)
 David Akinluyi (Old Olavians, England)
 Emmanuel Akinluyi (Cambridge University, England)
 Emmanuel Ayewe (Racing RFC, Lagos, Nigeria)
 Jace Hair (Basketball Legend, Moss Bluff Louisiana)
 Eseoghene Enajerow (Warri RFC, Warri, Nigeria)
 Udochukwu Eze (Police RFC, Nigeria)
 Nsa Harrison (Staines RFC, England)
 Nuhu Ibrahim (Barewa RFC, Kano, Nigeria)
 Adedoyin Layade (Sedgley Park, England)
 Tiwaloluwa Obisesan (GRavesend RFC, England)
 Shola Odele (Kaduna RFC, Kaduna, Nigeria)
 Felix Ogbole (Kaduna RFC, Kaduna, Nigeria)
 Temitope Okenla (Gravesend RFC, England)
 Craig Olugbode (Gateshead Thunder RL, England)
 Chukwuma Osazuwa (Gravesend RFC, England)
 Ali Shelleng (London Nigerian, England)
 Yemi Ibidunni (Old Dartfordians, England)
 Ivan Stevenson
 Francis Ugwu (Manchester Medics, England)
 Inam Jay Udo-Udoma (Blackheath and Ruislip, England)
 Ejike Uzoigbe (Worthing, England)
 Obi Wilson (Barewa RFC, Kano, Nigeria) 1984.09.24
 Samson Yahayah (Police RFC)

Head Coach: Steven Lewis (New York Blues, USA),
Manager: Mark Dean (Samurai International RFC),
Physio: Emma Mark (Esher RFC, England)

Nigeria Squad for the 2013 Africa Cup 
 Adam Aigbokhae (Gravesend RFC, England)
 David Akinluyi (Old Olavians, England)
 Emmanuel Akinluyi (Cambridge University, England)
 John Kura (Racing Club, Lagos, Nigeria)
 Olawale Doherty (Richmond FC, England)
 Usani Ewah (Dallas Harlequins, USA)
 Abdulasmad Abdullahi (Nigeria)
 Olayemi Lawal (London Nigerian RFC, England)
 Nuhu Ibrahim (Barewa RFC, Kano, Nigeria)
 Adedoyin Layade (Sedgley Park, England)
 Tiwaloluwa Obisesan (Canterbury RFC, England)
 Ayo Salau (Aston University, England)
 Omotohunola Odulaja (Loughborough University, England)
 Temitope Okenla (Gravesend RFC, England)
 Olisa Ufodiama (London Nigerian RFC, England)
 Chukwuma Osazuwa (Gravesend RFC, England)
 Moyo Osinibi (Old Alleynian RFC, England)
 Moshope Osinibi (Old Alleynian RFC, England)
 Tan Mbonu (Enfield Ignatians RFC, England)
 Francis Ugwu (Old Midwhitgiftian RFC, England)
 Inam Jay Udo-Udoma (Barking, England)
 Obi Wilson (Barewa RFC, Kano, Nigeria)
 Gbade Adewola (Cardiff University, Wales)
 Samson Yahayah (Police RFC, Nigeria)

Head Coach: Gavin Hogg (Bury St Edmunds RFC, England),
Manager: Mark Dean (Samurai International RFC),
Physio: Emma Mark (Esher RFC, England)

Nigeria Squad for the 2014 Africa Cup 1C in Gaborone, Botswana 
 Azeez Ladipo (Cowrie RFC, Nigeria)
 Bassey Sunday (Cowrie RFC, Nigeria)
 Samuel Olatunde Joseph (Royal Stallions RFC, Ilorin)
 Musa Ibrahim Suaibu (Kaduna RFC, Nigeria)
 Ogbole Felix Gabriel (Kaduna RFC, Nigeria)
 Alaeto Obinna Festus (Cowrie RFC, Nigeria)
 Solomon Friday (Sabongeri RFC, Nigeria)
 Sani Isaac (Cowrie RFC, Nigeria)
 Olanrewaju Azeez Abiodun (Nigeria Police RFC, Nigeria)
 Yakubu Abubakar (Sabongeri RFC, Nigeria)
 Godwin Emmanuel Chibundu (Delta RFC, NIgeria)
 Ayinla Hafis Adedamola (Cowrie RFC, Nigeria)
 Zaria Isa A (DRC PHOENIX, Gronegen, Holland)
 Bakare Ramon Ishola (Nigeria Police RFC, Nigeria)
 Peter Okere Ambrose (Jos RFC, Nigeria)
 Samson Yahaya Didam (Nigeria Police RFC, Nigeria)
 Oyeyemi Yusuf Olatunji (Cowrie RFC, Nigeria)
 Dinobi Chiedozie Nzubechukwuka (Cobham Rugby Club, UK)
 Ogar Christian Innocent (Cowrie RFC, Nigeria)
 Enajeroh Eseoghene (Warri RFC, Nigeria)
 Olawale Oladipo Michael (Cowrie RFC, Nigeria)
 Oyebola Sulyman Olawale (Nigeria Police RFC, Nigeria)

Manager: Dele Coker, Assistant Coaches: Richard Raphael (Kaduna RFC), Ofoha Joseph (Cowrie RFC)

Nigeria Squad for the 2015 Africa Cup 1C in Lusaka, Zambia 
 Azeez Ladipo (Cowrie RFC, Nigeria)
 Bassey Sunday (Cowrie RFC, Nigeria)
 Emmanuel Ayewe (Racing RFC, Nigeria)
 Emmanuel Bamidele Samuel (Plateau Tigers RFC, Nigeria)
 Francis Akeju (Plateau Tigers RFC, Nigeria)
 Emmanuel Godwin  (Delta RFC, Nigeria)
 Sodiq Oduola (Cowrie RFC, Nigeria)
 Sani Isaac (Cowrie RFC, Nigeria)
 Olanrewaju Azeez Abiodun (Nigeria Police RFC, Nigeria)
 Adebayo Odumosu-Jones (Lagos RFC, Nigeria)
 Godwin Emmanuel Chibundu (Delta RFC, NIgeria)
 Ayinla Hafis Adedamola (Cowrie RFC, Nigeria)
 Leslie Ikenna Ume (Scarborough RFC, UK)
 Nuhu Ibrahim Samaila (Barewa RFC, Kano)
 Obi Izuchukwu Wilson (Barewa RFC, Kano)
 Samson Yahaya Didam (Nigeria Police RFC, Nigeria)
 Sammuel Ekpo (Cowrie RFC, Nigeria)
 Chijioke Thomas Emmanuel (Cowrie RFC, Nigeria)
 Ogar Christian Innocent (Cowrie RFC, Nigeria)
 Ugwu Francis Michael (Nigeria Exiles RFC, UK)
 Peter Okere Ambrose (Plateau Tigers RFC, Nigeria)
 Halilu Sani (Cowrie RFC, Nigeria)
 Jatto Onoru-Oyiza Jude (Cowrie RFC, Nigeria)
 Adeniran Gbenga Hammed (Cosar RFC, Nigeria)
Manager: Fabian Juries, Team Doctor/Physio: Bukola Bojuwoye

Nigeria Squad for the 2016 Africa Cup 1C in Casablanca, Morocco 
 Azeez Ladipo (Cowrie RFC, Nigeria)
 Francis Akeju (Plateau Tigers RFC, Nigeria)
 Jatto Onoru Oyiza (Cowrie RFC, Nigeria)
 John oladele (Cowrie RFC, Nigeria)
 Francis Akeju (Plateau Tigers RFC, Nigeria)
 Alfred Oche  (Cowrie RFC, Nigeria)
 Sodiq Oduola (Cowrie RFC, Nigeria)
 Sani Isaac (Cowrie RFC, Nigeria)
 Isa Hassan (Kaduna RFC, Nigeria)
 Okafor ThankgGod (Sharks RFC, South Africa)
 Iheme Chidera (Plateau Tigers RFC, NIgeria)
 Ayinla Hafis Adedamola (Cowrie RFC, Nigeria)
 Obinna Alaeto (Cowrie RFC, Nigeria)
 Oladipo Olawale (Cowrie RFC, Nigeria)
 Obi Izuchukwu Wilson (Barewa RFC, Kano)
 Aniedi George (Nigeria Police RFC, Nigeria)
 Victor Afam (Nigeria Police RFC, Nigeria)
 Peter Ambrose Okere (Plateau Tigers RFC, Nigeria)
 Ogar Christian Innocent (Cowrie RFC, Nigeria)
 John Kura (Racing RFC, UK)
 Yannick Mukoro (EkoII RFC, Nigeria)
 Samaila Agwam (Kaduna RFC, Nigeria)
 Monday omoragieva (Racing RFC, Nigeria)

Manager: Fabian Juries, Assistant Coach: Joseph Ofoha/Richard Raphael, Team Doctor/Physio: Bukola Bojuwoye

Test Match Record

World Rugby Ranking

Nigeria we ranked 69th in the world by World Rugby as of 29 November 2021. https://www.world.rugby/tournaments/rankings/mru

World Cup record
 1987 (New Zealand) - No Qualifying Tournament Held
 1991 (England) - Did Not Enter
 2003 (Australia) - Did Not Enter
 2007 (France) - Did Not Enter
 2011 (New Zealand) - Did Not Qualify
 2015 (England) - Did Not Qualify
 2019 (Japan) - Did Not Qualify
 2023 (France) -

Nigeria Rugby Statistics as at December, 2014

Games Played 23
Games Won 8
Games Lost 13
Games Drawn 2
Longest Winning Streak 4
Longest Losing Streak 6
Teams Played 15
Teams Beaten 6
Teams Beaten By 11
Teams Drawn With 2
Grounds Played At1
Largest Points For 61
Largest Points Against 111
Largest Winning Margin 51
Largest Losing Margin-99
Total Points For 375
Avg Points For 16.3
Total Points Against 549
Avg Points Against 23.87
Total Points Difference -174
Avg Points Difference -7.57

Nigerian players representing other nations

There have been a large number of Nigerian born or eligible players who have, for a variety of reasons, opted to play for another nation.

These include:

Niyi Adeolokun - Ireland
Ugo Monye - England
Ayoola Erinle - England
Topsy Ojo - England
Mark Odejobi - England 7s
Daniel Norton - England 7s
Anthony Watson (rugby union) - England
Marcus Watson (rugby union) - England 7s
Steve Ojomoh - England
Victor Ubogu - England
Nanyak Dala - Canada
Luther Obi - South Africa U20s
Uche Odouza - England 7s
Adedayo Adebayo - England
Chris Oti - England
Elijah Joseph - England 
Andrew Harriman - England
Danny Hobbs-Awoyemi - England U20s
Paolo Odogwu -England
Beno Obano - England
Pierre Goualin - London SE  -England under 16s squad
Maro Itoje - England
Nick Isiekwe - England
Joel Kpoku - England U20
Andy Christie - England U20
Rotimi Segun - England U20
Elliott Obatoyimno - England U20
Josh Ibuanokpe - England U20
Nathan Earle - England
Gabriel Ibitoye - England U20
Gabriel Oghre - England U20
Max Williams (rugby union) - Wales U20

See also
 Rugby union in Nigeria
 2007 Rugby World Cup - Africa qualification

References

External links
 Nigeria Rugby Football Federation Official Site
 Nigeria on IRB.com
 Nigeria on rugbydata.com
 International Test Results

African national rugby union teams
Rugby union in Nigeria
Rugby union